Zhemchug Canyon is an underwater canyon located in the middle of the Bering Sea. It is the deepest submarine canyon in the world, and is also tied for the widest.

Geography
It has a vertical relief of  dropping from the shallow shelf of the Bering Sea to the depths of the Aleutian Basin. It has two main branches, each larger than typical continental margin canyons such as the Monterey Canyon. What makes the Zhemchug Canyon the  world's largest is not only its great depth, but its immense cross-sectional and drainage area, (11,350 km2) and volume (5800 km3).

In 2016, Michelle Ridgeway explored the canyon piloting an eight-foot submarine in an expedition sponsored by Greenpeace.

Marine wildlife
Zhemchug Canyon is important habitat for many species of ocean wildlife.  The endangered short-tailed albatross congregates to feed over the surface waters of the canyon. Marine mammals such as northern fur seals feed in the canyon as do dolphins and many species of whales. Habitat-forming invertebrates such as bubblegum coral, bamboo coral, soft corals, Hexactinellid sponges, and other sponges have been identified during trawl surveys in the canyon. It is where the opilio (snow) crab and bairdi crab can be found.

See also

References

Submarine canyons of the Bering Sea